The men's super-G competition of the 2019 Winter Universiade was held at Bobrovy Log, Krasnoyarsk, Russia on 3 March 2019.

Results
The race was started at 13:00.

References

Men's super G